Mackworth may refer to:
Mackworth, Amber Valley, a village and civil parish in Derbyshire, England
Mackworth Castle
Mackworth, Derby, a housing estate and ward in the city of Derby, Derbyshire, England
Humphrey Mackworth (1657-1727)
Humphrey Mackworth (born 1631)